An open border is a border that enables free movement of people (and often of goods) between jurisdictions with no restrictions on movement and is  lacking substantive border control. A border may be an open border due to intentional legislation allowing free movement of people across the border (de jure), or a border may be an open border due to a lack of legal controls, a lack of adequate enforcement or adequate supervision of the border (de facto). An example of the former is the Schengen Agreement between most members of the European Economic Area (EFTA and the EU). An example of the latter has been the border between Bangladesh and India, which is becoming controlled. The term "open borders" applies only to the flow of people, not the flow of goods and services, and only to borders between political jurisdictions, not to mere boundaries of privately owned property.

Open borders are the norm for borders between subdivisions within the boundaries of sovereign states, though some countries do maintain internal border controls (for example between the People's Republic of China mainland and the special administrative regions of Hong Kong and Macau, or between the United States and the unincorporated territories of Guam, the Northern Marianas and American Samoa, and the Minor Outlying Islands). Open borders are also usual between member states of federations, though (very rarely) movement between member states may be controlled in exceptional circumstances. Federations, confederations and similar multi-national unions typically maintain external border controls through a collective border control system, though they sometimes have open borders with other non-member states through special international agreements such as between Schengen Agreement countries as mentioned above.

In the past, many states had open international borders either in practice or due to a lack of any legal restriction. Many authors, such as John Maynard Keynes, have identified the early 20th century and particularly World War I as the point when such controls became common.

There have been sporadic attempts to promote global open borders as a viable policy option. Open borders quickly became popular after 1889. The International Emigration Conference held in Rome in May 1924 stated that anybody has the right to immigrate to a different country if they wanted to. Before the 1880s, migration to the United States was not fully controlled. During World War I it became easier for people to migrate from their country of origin to foreign countries. After World War II, countries were looking for many new workers, and Germany issued a guest work program to attract more people to work.  Later, in the 1970s to 1980s strict borders were reinstated in industrialized countries. Currently, immigration is more restricted and harder for low-skilled and low-income people.

Types of borders

There are multiple types of national borders in use around the world. Some of these are:

A conditionally open border is a border that allows movement of people across the border that meet a special set of conditions. This special set of conditions which limits the application of border controls that would normally otherwise apply could be defined by an international agreement or international law, or the special conditions could be defined by a regulation or law of the jurisdiction that the people are claiming the right to enter.  Conditionally open borders generally requires a claim to be submitted from the people who are proposing to enter the new jurisdiction stating why they meet the special conditions which allow entry into the new jurisdiction. The new jurisdiction may detain the people until their claim is approved for entry into the new jurisdiction, or they may release them into the new jurisdiction while their claim is being processed. Whenever a conditionally open border is allowed, a considerable effort is often required to ensure that border controls do not break down to such an extent that it becomes an open border situation. An example of a conditionally open border is a border of any country which allows movement of asylum seekers due to application of either the 1951 Refugee Convention or international law which allows people to cross a border to escape a situation where their lives are directly threatened or in significant danger. Another example is the border between Ireland and the United Kingdom. The two countries allow unrestricted movement of their own citizens, but in order to enjoy such movement across the Irish Sea, those same citizens may be required to provide evidence at seaports and airports that they are UK or Irish nationals. These checks are by the police, not immigration officers. (there are no such controls on the highly porous land border between them).

A controlled border is a border that allows movement of people between different jurisdictions but places restrictions and sometimes significant restrictions on this movement. This type of border may require a person crossing this border to obtain a visa or in some cases may allow a short period of visa free travel in the new jurisdiction. A controlled border always has some method of documenting and recording people movements across the border for later tracking and checking compliance with any conditions associated with the visa or any other border crossing conditions. A controlled border places limitations on what a person crossing the border can do in the new jurisdiction, this is usually manifested in limitations on employment and also it limits the length of time the person can legally remain in the new jurisdiction.  A controlled border often requires some type of barrier, such as a river, ocean or fence to ensure that the border controls are not bypassed so that any people wishing to cross the border are directed to authorized border crossing points where any border crossing conditions can be properly monitored.  Given the large scale movement of people today for work, holidays, study and other reasons a controlled border also requires internal checks and internal enforcement within the jurisdiction to ensure that any people who have entered the jurisdiction are in fact complying with any border crossing conditions and that they are not overstaying to reside illegally or as an undocumented resident.  Most international borders are by legislative intent of the controlled border type.  However, where there is a lack of adequate internal enforcement or where the borders are land borders, the border is often controlled only on part of the border, while other parts of the border may remain open to such an extent that it may be considered an open border due to lack of supervision and enforcement.

A closed border is a border that prevents movement of people between different jurisdictions with limited or no exceptions associated with this movement.  These borders normally have fences or walls in which any gates or border crossings are closed and if these border gates are opened they generally only allow movement of people in exceptional circumstances. Perhaps the most famous example of an extant closed border is the Demilitarized Zone between North Korea and South Korea. The Berlin Wall could also have been called a closed border.

Borders can be open or and closed based on: entry status, entry duration, entry qualifications, entrant rights and obligations, and entry quotas. Entry status refers to the occupation of someone when and if they are allowed to cross a border, whether they are a student, worker, soldier, immigrant. One's status effects the chances of being permitted to cross a border. “Most states control border crossing by limiting the duration of any visit.” Entry qualifications are restrictions based on factors such as health, age, income, religion, race. “Many countries, including Canada and Singapore, will admit wealthy immigrants who can demonstrate an intention and capacity to invest in the country.” Entrants rights and obligations are the restrictions that will be placed on those who have already been permitted to cross a border: you must follow certain rules and regulations given by the government to be allowed to stay in that country. A government may allow you to take up residency but may not allow you to work, and those who are allowed to work may not be able to find work due to the restrictions and forms of employment allowed. Entry quotas are restrictions based on the number of immigrants allowed across a border within a certain frame of time: if you meet all of the qualifications to cross a border, but the country you want to enter has already met its quota for allowing immigrants inside, you may still not be allowed to enter.

As seen from the examples below, there are differing degrees of "openness" of a border, the nature of which depends on whether or not there are physical passport controls in place (and enforced). Passport control by police or immigration officers may be in place on some kinds of border but citizens of the destination territory or participating territories are permitted to cross using at most an identity card without any further approval, restrictions or conditions. Examples of the most open type of border include the Schengen zone or the [UK/Ireland] Common Travel Area, where transit across the inter-state frontiers are entirely uncontrolled, and third-country illegal immigration is controlled by internal policing as with any other kind of clandestine entry. Examples of near-open borders include the border between the Common Travel Area (on the one hand) and the Schengen Zone (on the other) which, despite having full passport control, is an internal EU border that EU citizens can pass freely without any conditions, other than an identity card. Non-EU nationals are subject to full passport and visa control measures at airports and some seaports. A hybrid of these two possibilities is the border between Russia and Belarus in the Union State which lacks any physical control but formally foreigners are not permitted to use an uncontrolled crossing.

Arguments for and against 
For impact of immigration, see "immigration". See "Free migration" for more arguments.

Arguments for open borders 

Open borders allow free migration between nations. Several arguments for open borders and against controlled borders are as follows:

Arguments from economic benefit 

Open border advocates argue that free migration would be the most effective way to reduce world poverty. A literature summary by economist Michael Clemens estimates that open borders would result in an increase of 67-147% in GWP (gross world product), with a median estimate of a doubling of world GDP. One estimate placed the economic benefits at 78 trillion. This increase in GWP would occur primarily because open borders allow workers to go to businesses that can pay them more, and these businesses can pay them more because they help their workers to be more productive.
Political philosopher Adam James Tebble argues that more open borders aid both the economic and institutional development of poorer migrant sending countries, contrary to proponents of "brain-drain" critiques of migration. Because migrants from developing countries often earn higher wages after moving to a more developed country, they often also send remittances to relatives in their home country to an extent which sometimes negates the originally harmful effect of them leaving. (see Human capital flight for more).
Economist and writer Philippe Legrain argues that the countries of the world need migration to help global trade and reduce the occurrence of regional wars. Legrain further argues that due to the productivity gap between countries in the Global North and the Global South, open migration would significantly benefit the world economy. Since richer countries generally have better industrial capital and technology, by allowing migrants from the Global South to access these resources, it would narrow the productivity gap, resulting not only in an increase of economic gains but also in a better distribution of profit.
Bryan Caplan has argued that, in the U.S., increasing immigration with the current ratio of high- and low-skilled workers would have a net positive fiscal impact. He states that a truly open borders policy would result in an altered ratio of low- and high-skilled workers where the productivity effect of immigration negates the negative fiscal impact of older low-skilled migrants. In addition to that, Caplan argued that native-born populations also have a larger fiscal burden than comparable immigrants (partially because immigrants are usually already working and taxpaying age).

Arguments from ethical obligation 

From a human rights perspective, free migration may be seen to complement Article 13 of the Universal Declaration on Human Rights: (1) Everyone has the right to freedom of movement and residence within the borders of each state. (2) Everyone has the right to leave any country, including his own, and to return to his country.
Joseph Carens argues that the social inequality imposed by closed borders is so great it outweighs any challenges to their political or economic feasibility. He argues we should open borders based on the same reasons we reject the feudal system: both are legal systems which afford privilege based on the luck of birthright and maintain inequality by limiting the lower socioeconomic status groups' freedom to move. Carens argues for a critical approach to the current border system as a step towards collective change. He acknowledges that critiques are not the equivalent of a perfect roadmap to establish open borders. However, further utilizing his comparison with feudalism, he explains that while in the past it seemed impossible to overcome such a system now looking back, approaching the system critically was one of the many necessary steps towards change.
American bioethicist Jacob M. Appel has argued that "treating human beings differently, simply because they were born on the opposite side of a national boundary," is inherently unethical. According to Appel, such "birthrights" are only defensible if they serve "useful and meaningful social purposes" (such as inheritance rights, which encourage mothers and fathers to work and save for their children), but the "birthright of nationality" does not do so.
Restrictions on mobility can only be justified if it can be shown that those restrictions prevent significant harm. Since research indicates that open borders will be better for both the natives and the migrants, and at the very least have not been shown to cause major harm, those restrictions are unjustified. The remote control methods used to keep hopeful immigrants out of wealthy nations (such as visa programs, flood lights at borders, or barbed wire fencing for example) slow down the avenues of legal migration and make other avenues of seeking asylum a more perilous endeavor.
Open borders would help save the lives of people who would otherwise have to wait for countries to decide the fate of refugees. As stated by author Sasha Polakow-Suransky, countries have enough to care for their citizens and others. Caplan has also shared that not doing anything and being a bystander is just as harmful to refugees. It is estimated that open borders would allow people to be safe.
Refugees who are in danger flee to Western countries which have provided safety and comfort. David Miliband argues that having open borders will rescue the lives of migrants who are constantly struggling to survive in inhabitable areas. According to him, accepting migrants into Western countries shows the acceptance for those in need and expresses that support and guidance is essential to saving the lives of innocent people.
According to London School of Economics political theorist Chandran Kukathas, immigration control is a threat to freedom and national self-determination. He argues, "immigration control is not merely about preventing outsiders from moving across borders. It is about controlling what outsiders do once in a society: whether they work, reside, study, set up businesses, or share their lives with others. But controlling outsiders-immigrants or would-be immigrants-requires regulating, monitoring, and sanctioning insiders, those citizens and residents who might otherwise hire, trade with, house, teach, or generally associate with outsiders."
Open borders cannot be dismissed as merely a utopian idea, argues Harald Bauder, because they do not propose an alternative way to organize human society but rather are a critique of closed or controlled borders. This critique, however, invites the search for practical as well as radical solutions to the problematic consequences of contemporary migration practices, including the deaths of migrants in the Mediterranean Sea, the US–Mexico border, and elsewhere. Bauder takes a more pragmatic approach as he hypothetically explores what an open border world would look like. Since open borders would allow for free movement but would not necessarily prevent discrimination on the basis of status, he first argues that the key to a just world with open borders is access to citizenship for all persons within a territory. By looking at different basis for citizenship, he explains that granting citizenship solely based on place of residence, independent of any other factors, would be a step towards a world where cross-border mobility doesn’t result in unfair and unequal treatment.

Arguments against open borders

Controlled borders restrict migration by non-citizens. Several arguments for controlled borders and against open borders are as follows:

 That controlled borders encourage responsible policies in relation to population and birth rates for countries by preventing high population and high birth rate countries from disgorging their people onto other low population and low birth rate countries.
 Large-scale immigration from poorer countries into richer countries can create a "brain drain" in the source country, where educated professionals leave their home country to live elsewhere, depriving their home countries of an educated workforce. For example, in 2010 there were more Ethiopian doctors living in Chicago than there were in Ethiopia itself.
 The realism of open borders has been called into question, given that it could potentially require a world government.
 In the United States, it has been argued that it may cause increased backlash from the white population who carry 75 percent (but decreasing) of the political vote. This backlash includes preventing immigrants access to basic forms of governmental or community support as well as the creation of policies that specifically criminalize immigrants. This trend is based on studies demonstrating the more the Democratic Party shows positivity towards immigration, the more the white vote shifts towards conservative Republicans who support more restrictive immigration policies.
 The influx of low-skill immigrant labor that open borders would bring into higher-skilled economies like the United States is feared to cause the standard for the average worker to decrease. Progressives such as Senator Bernie Sanders reject open borders as a loss for the American worker. Additionally, economic models that resemble the Nordic System operate in a way that rewards high-skilled work and seeks to avoid bolstering domestic and low-skill work that would make employment more accessible to refugees.
 It has been argued that an open border could cause a Great Replacement of traditional values and ideals of the receiving country, claiming that multiculturalism is not possible in certain countries and/or in the case of certain immigrant groups. For example French National Rally leader Marine Le Pen says that France should not cater to Muslim ways of life because they go against French liberal ideals. Others, such as Reihan Salam, have argued that low-skilled immigrants in the U.S. have formed a racialized class distinct from Americans, and that the implementation of open borders will create and deepen a cultural and economic clash in America due to differing ideals and values. Fear of losing traditional values has also been a contributing factor to the rise of the populist parties, which are greatly concerned with the social, cultural, and ethnic conservation of the majority, but the need to keep a certain ethnicity as the majority has spawned anti-immigrant beliefs within particular parties; thus, it has been observed that some populist party's views depict immigration as a negative, even as widespread immigration causes the composition of the population to change, due to the ethnic differences that immigrants bring.

Hans-Hermann Hoppe and Murray N. Rothbard argue that open borders violate property rights and that all public proverty must be privatized thus leaving the decision of who entries or not to the owners calling this Market/Private Property Borders.

Political debate

The modern debate around open borders is not clearly delineated into the traditional left–right political spectrum and party identification can be quite mobile based on the issue of immigration, but in the United States, visible stances and differences between parties based solely on immigration and open borders became apparent after the Hart-Cellar Act of 1965. Some groups traditionally seen as right-wing, like Libertarians, support unrestricted immigration, while nativists like Donald Trump oppose them. Similarly, some figures on the left wing, like democratic socialist Bernie Sanders reject open border policies, while others support open borders (as shown by the slogan "no human is illegal"). In addition, the population of the Democratic Party has shifted from a massive white majority to almost an even split with non-white citizens since 1980, which has led some members of the Democratic Party to shift more towards the political right, and until then both political parties had been more or less aligned regarding immigration. The dividing line accords more closely with the libertarian-authoritarian political spectrum.

It has been proposed that borders between the North American Free Trade Agreement (NAFTA) countries be opened. If goods and services and corporations can cross international boundaries without restraint, it is argued, then it does not make sense to restrain on the flow of people who work to make those goods and services. Some estimate that open borders where people are free to move and find work could result in 78 trillion dollars in economic gains.

Those in favor of a global migration policy advocate the adoption of a migratory regulatory system and new criteria to better guaranteed all rights (civil, social and political) for all immigrants. It is necessary to expand migration policy to create better management of global migratory system. Some propose a new meaning and understanding of global citizenship to establish a border global migration system. Migration is under the control and management of local governments and officials, but it is both a domestic political issue, and a global issue which needs joint efforts from different countries.

Variables informing the political debate

Attitudes toward immigrants 

The Pew Research Center has indicated that there are generally more people who perceive immigrants’ effect on their country because of their work and talents as an advantage rather than a disadvantage across 18 countries (including the United States and several European countries with the largest migrant populations) containing a combined 51% of the world's migrant population; there are generally more people in favor of deporting immigrants living in their country illegally across the same parameters. While there are more people on the ideological left who have a positive view of immigrants and more people on the ideological right who are in favor of deporting illegal immigrants, there is no necessary correspondence with what most people on each end of the political spectrum are inclined to support.

The media is a major influencing factor for attitudes towards immigrants. It is documented the more the media portrays immigration negatively, the less white Americans will vote in favor of open borders and the more likely they will continue believing in the immigrant threat narrative. This narrative claims the more immigrants there are, the bigger the threat there is to the native culture, language, homes, jobs, and even political offices. An analysis of three decades’ worth of articles in the New York Times found their coverage increased the negative lens of immigration far more than the positive by focusing their articles mostly on negative aspects and images of immigration. It is significant to note studies show white Americans largely do not distinguish between an American-born Latinos and an immigrant Latinos when thinking about immigration issues, voting, and choosing partisan ties. Native-born individuals report slightly more positive views when asked about impacts an immigrant may have on their country, especially when considering their contribution to cultural life. However, when it comes to the labour market, half of the native-born population hold no particular view when it comes to immigrants taking or creating jobs.

It should also be noted that attitudes towards immigrants shift over time, much like any political issue. Using California as a case study, Manuel Pastor found that the views of immigration in the state have been fluid at best. While many view California as a liberal haven that is accepting and tolerant of immigrants today, much of the state's history has had less favorable views towards immigration. Pastor suggests there is a link between California's improved domestic economic stability over the past two decades and its attitudes towards immigrants. He argues California has created an environment more accepting of diversity by reducing the economic disparity between cities and the predominantly white suburbs,  along with reforming some of the racist economic and educational policies created in the late seventies and early eighties (such as Proposition 13). He suggests this shift towards an ethos which sees liberal social reform and economic prosperity as compatible has driven the State's movement towards less punitive immigration reform. This view acknowledges the economic and social value of well-integrated immigrant communities. Pastor makes the point that even in societies where immigration is viewed negatively, values are able to shift, and if the ultra-liberal thriving economic state of California can radically change the perception it has on immigration, then it is quite possible for other states or nations to shift their perceptions.

Integration 

Integration has been defined as the process of immigrant and native born populations changing to resemble one another as a result of the influx of people into a particular territory. There is a split on the degree to which individuals living in countries with the 18 largest migrant populations would want immigrants to integrate and the effects of integration on both immigrant and non-immigrant populations are varied. In the United States, for example, integration is successful in terms of education, employment and earnings, occupations, poverty, language, health, crime, and family patterns; however, successful integration does not necessarily entail improvement on well-being. Integration can even lead to further backlash against immigration by non-white populations who have assimilated successfully. It has been found that more than half of Hispanics support increased security among the border in order to reduce illegal crossings and that countries with a high share of immigrants may be more susceptible to favor right-wing policies such as strict immigration; thus, it has been suggested that successful integration does not guarantee continued patterns for future generations.

Examples of open borders

Svalbard
Uniquely, the Norwegian special territory of Svalbard is an entirely visa-free zone. No person requires a visa or residence permit and anyone may live and work in Svalbard indefinitely, regardless of citizenship. The Svalbard Treaty grants treaty nationals equal right of abode as Norwegian nationals. So far, non-treaty nationals have been admitted visa-free as well.
"Regulations concerning rejection and expulsion from Svalbard" are in force on a non-discriminatory basis. Grounds for exclusion include lack of means of support, and violation of laws or regulations. Same-day visa-free transit at Oslo Airport is possible when travelling on non-stop flights to Svalbard.

List of groups of states with common open borders

Examples of controlled borders
 The border between the United States and  Mexico is controlled. This border is the most frequently crossed controlled international boundary in the world, with approximately 350 million legal crossings being made annually.
 Bangladesh and India share a borderwhich India is in the process of turning into a controlled border by the completion of a full border fence between the two countries to control the flow of people and prevent illegal migration.
 Entry into any of the U.S. minor outlying Islands requires permission from United States Armed Forces, and entry to the territory of American Samoa for US citizens requires a return ticket.

Examples of closed borders
The information in this section may not be complete or up to date. Prospective travellers should check with government sources for the most current information.
 North Korea and South Korea share a militarized border, known as the Military Demarcation Line, which has been in operation since the suspension of the Korean War in July 1953 (when the Korean Armistice Agreement established the Korean Demilitarized Zone near 38° N). The strip of land along the border has many landmines and movement detection equipment. There are two Border Crossings (one road, one rail) between North and South Korea but are mostly closed though they are opened from time to time with strict restrictions.
 The Armenia–Azerbaijan border is completely closed, due to the state of war between the two countries over the Nagorno-Karabakh conflict.
 Turkey closed its border with Armenia in April 1993, out of solidarity for Azerbaijan in the Nagorno-Karabakh conflict.  However, as of 2023, Turkey has opened its borders with Armenia for direct air cargo flights.
 The border between Ukraine and Moldova at Transnistria is closed to all since 2022.
 The land border between Algeria and Morocco has been completely closed since 1994 although there are airline services between the two countries.
 The Central African Republic's state of civil war has caused Chad to close all land borders between the two countries.
 The Colombia–Venezuela border is partially closed by the government of Venezuela.
 The Israel–Lebanon border is closed due to the hostilities between Israel and Lebanon.
 The Israel–Syria border is closed due to the hostilities between Israel and Syria, but there have been some legal crossings.
 The Belarus–Russia border is totally closed for foreigners despite being totally open for their own citizens.
 There are no road crossings going into Gaza Strip, from Israel due to hostilities between Israel and Hamas which controls the Gaza Strip and from Egypt, in order to prevent weapon smuggling. The crossing with Egypt, and rarely with Israel, is opened  to selected people due to humanitarian reasons with strict restrictions.
 From June 2017–January 2021, Saudi Arabia temporarily closed its border with fellow Gulf Cooperation Council member Qatar, due to the 2017–18 Qatar diplomatic crisis.

See also
 Free migration
 Freedom of movement
 Libertarian perspectives on immigration
 National security
 Criticism of multiculturalism

Notes

References

Further reading

 ACME. 2003. Vol. 2.2, themed issue: "Engagements: Borders and Immigration.
 
 
 Barry, Brian, and Goodin, Robert E., eds. 1992. Free Movement: Ethical Issues in the Transnational Migration of People and of Money. University Park, PA: Pennsylvania State University Press.
 
 Bauder, Harald. 2017. Migration Borders Freedom. London: Routledge.
 Blake, Michael. 2003. "Immigration." In A Companion to Applied Ethics, ed. R. G. Frey and C. H. Wellman. Oxford: Blackwell.
 Bosniak, Linda. 2006. The Citizen and the Alien: Dilemmas of Contemporary Membership. Princeton: Princeton University Press.
 Brubaker, W. R, ed. 1989. Immigration and the Politics of Citizenship in Europe and North America. Lanham, MD: University Press of America.
 
 
 Cole, Phillip. 2000. Philosophies of Exclusion: Liberal Political Theory and Immigration. Edinburgh: Edinburgh University Press.
 Dauvergne, Catherine. 2008. Making People Illegal: What Globalization Means for Migration and Law. Cambridge: Cambridge University Press.
 Dummett, Michael. 2001. On Immigration and Refugees. London: Routledge.
 Ethics and Economics. 2006. Volume 4.1. Special issue on immigration.
 Gibney, Mark, ed. 1988. Open Borders?  Closed Societies?  The Ethical and Political Issues. New York: Greenwood Press.
 
 
 Miller, David, and Hashmi, Sohail, eds. 2001. Boundaries and Justice: Diverse Ethical Perspectives. Princeton, NJ: Princeton University Press.
 Miller, David. 2005. "Immigration: The Case for Limits." In Contemporary Debates in Applied Ethics, ed. A. I. Cohen and C. H. Wellman. Oxford: Blackwell.
 
 Schwartz, Warren F., ed. 1995. Justice in Immigration. Cambridge: Cambridge University Press.
 Swain, Carol M., ed. 2007. Debating Immigration. New York: Cambridge University Press.
 Torpey, John. 2000. The Invention of the Passport: Surveillance, Citizenship, and the State. Cambridge: Cambridge University Press.
 Walzer, Michael. 1983. Spheres of Justice: A Defence of Pluralism and Equality. Oxford: Blackwell.
 

International law
Expedited border crossing schemes